Mashchenko is a Ukrainian surname. Notable people with the surname include:

 Danyl Mashchenko (born 2002), Ukrainian footballer
 Ivan Mashchenko (1895–1941), Red Army colonel
 Oleksandr Mashchenko (born 1985), Ukrainian Paralympic swimmer
 Ruslan Mashchenko (born 1971), Russian hurdler and sprinter
 Vadym Mashchenko (born 2000), Ukrainian footballer

See also
 

Ukrainian-language surnames